Dolly Zegerius (1924 or 1925 – September 18, 2019) was a national Indonesian athlete who represented Indonesia at the 1980 Southeast Asian Games.

Personal life 
Zegerius was born in the Netherlands and came to Indonesia on January 1, 1947. Zegerius was married to the retired Major General Soetarjo Soerjosoemarno since 1943.

Death 
Zegerius died at the age of 94 at the Jakarta Medistra Hospital on September 18, 2019.

References

Literature
Janssen, Hilde; Enkele reis Indonesië: vier Amsterdamse vrouwen in hun nieuwe vaderland; 2009; Nieuw Amsterdam publishing; ISBN 9789046819265.

Indonesian female athletes
1920s births
2019 deaths
Naturalised citizens of Indonesia
Dutch emigrants to Indonesia

Indonesian people of Dutch descent
Indonesian people of Dutch-Jewish descent